Mohamed Khaldi (born 5 March 1975 in Annaba) is an Algerian long-distance runner. He specializes in the distances from 1500 through 5000 metres. He competed in the 1500 metres at the 2000 Summer Olympics and the 2004 Summer Olympics.

Achievements

Personal bests
1500 metres - 3:33.03 min (2001)
3000 metres - 7:38.78 min (2001)
5000 metres - 13:17.71 min (2002)
3000 metres steeplechase - 8:46.11 min (2004)

References

External links

1975 births
Living people
Algerian male long-distance runners
Algerian male steeplechase runners
Athletes (track and field) at the 2000 Summer Olympics
Athletes (track and field) at the 2004 Summer Olympics
Olympic athletes of Algeria
People from Annaba
Mediterranean Games gold medalists for Algeria
Mediterranean Games silver medalists for Algeria
Mediterranean Games medalists in athletics
Athletes (track and field) at the 2001 Mediterranean Games
21st-century Algerian people
20th-century Algerian people